William H. C. Propp (born 1957) is an American historian of Near-East civilizations. Propp served as a professor of history at the University of California San Diego (UCSD) from 1983 until his retirement in 2017. Propp studied Near eastern languages and civilizations at Harvard University before teaching at UC San Diego in 1983 at the Judaic Studies Department.

Propp's work focuses on the biblical account concerning the Exodus. Propp supports the view that the biblical account of the Israelite Exodus from Egypt cannot be described as “historical” and that the potential evidence to support the account is too diffuse to be adequately tested. In terms of biblical narrative, Propp views features of the story, such as the hardening of Pharaoh's heart, as sharing similarities with other epics such as the Homeric epic where the gods implant either cowardice or courage into humans who already demonstrate bravery or fear. This may be viewed critically as a divine punishment for humans for sins that may ultimately be blamed instead on the gods themselves.

Works 
 Water in the Wilderness: A Biblical Motif and Its Mythological Background. Harvard Semitic Monographs, 1987.
 Editor with B. Halpern and D.N. Freedman, The Hebrew Bible and Its Interpreters. Eisenbrauns, 1990.
 Editor, Studies in Hebrew and Aramaic Orthography by F.I. Andersen, A.D. Forbes, and D.N. Freedman. Eisenbrauns, 1992.
 Exodus 1-18. Anchor Bible. Doubleday, 1998.
 Editor with R.E. Friedman, Le-David Maskil: A Birthday Tribute to David Noel Freedman. Eisenbrauns, 2004.
 Exodus 19-40. Anchor Bible. Doubleday, 2006.

References 

University of California, San Diego faculty
1957 births
Living people
Harvard University alumni